Lincoln Square is a mixed-use urban development in Bellevue, Washington, owned by prominent local developer Kemper Freeman. Lincoln Square, located along Bellevue Way between NE 6th and NE 8th streets, consists of two skyscrapers with retail and restaurant space, and a movie theater; and a 148-room residential tower and 337-room luxury hotel (One Lincoln Tower); and underground parking. The development constitutes part of "The Bellevue Collection", which consists of Freeman's properties in downtown Bellevue alongside  Bellevue Place and Bellevue Square. The office tower is leased to Eddie Bauer's corporate headquarters and Microsoft; the hotel is occupied by Westin Hotels & Resorts.

The first phase was completed in November 2005, after Freeman acquired a majority stake in the project in 2003. A $1.2 billion expansion, consisting of two mixed-use towers, was announced in 2013 and began construction in 2014; the project, known as Lincoln Square South, was completed in January 2017 alongside an expansion of the Bellevue Square mall.

Tenants
Coldwell Banker Bain
Eddie Bauer
Merrill Lynch
Microsoft
Ballmer Group
Stifel Financial
The Pokémon Company International
Unity
Valve
Westin Hotels & Resorts

Gallery

References

External links
 Lincoln Square official website

Shopping malls in King County, Washington
Shopping malls established in 2005
Skyscrapers in Bellevue, Washington
Residential buildings completed in 2005
Residential buildings in Washington (state)
Office buildings in Washington (state)
James K. M. Cheng buildings
Residential skyscrapers in Washington (state)
Skyscraper hotels in Washington (state)
2005 establishments in Washington (state)